Clyde George Washington (March 21, 1938 – December 29, 1974) was a professional American football cornerback in the American Football League (AFL). After playing college football for Purdue, Washington was drafted by the Cleveland Browns in the 10th round (116th overall) of the 1960 National Football League Draft but played five seasons for the AFL's Boston Patriots (1960–1961) and New York Jets (1963–1965).

References

1938 births
1974 deaths
American football cornerbacks
Boston Patriots players
New York Jets players
Purdue Boilermakers football players
People from Carlisle, Pennsylvania
Players of American football from Pennsylvania